Mona Lisa and the Blood Moon is a 2021 American fantasy thriller film written and directed by Ana Lily Amirpour. It stars Kate Hudson, Jun Jong-seo, Ed Skrein, Evan Whitten, and Craig Robinson.

The film had its world premiere at the 78th Venice International Film Festival on September 5, 2021. It was released in the United States on September 30, 2022, by Saban Films.

Cast
 Kate Hudson as Bonnie "Bonnie Belle" Hunt
 Jun Jong-seo as Mona Lisa Lee
 Craig Robinson as Officer Harold
 Ed Skrein as Fuzz
 Evan Whitten as Charlie Hunt

Production
In October 2018, it was announced Kate Hudson, Craig Robinson, Altonio Jackson, and Zac Efron had joined the cast of the film, with Ana Lily Amirpour directing from a screenplay she wrote. John Lesher will serve as a producer under his Le Grisbi Productions banner. In April 2019, Jun Jong-seo joined the cast of the film. In July 2019, it was announced Ed Skrein and Evan Whitten had joined the cast of the film, with Skrein replacing Efron.

Principal photography began in July 2019. Alongside original music by Daniele Luppi, the soundtrack includes several songs by Bottin. It was filmed on location in New Orleans, Louisiana.

Release
Mona Lisa and the Blood Moon had its world premiere at the 78th Venice International Film Festival on September 5, 2021. In March 2022, Saban Films acquired distribution rights to the film. It was released in the United States on September 30, 2022.

Reception
On the review aggregator website Rotten Tomatoes, the film holds an approval rating of 75% based on reviews from 65 critics, with an average rating of 6.6/10. The website's critics consensus reads, "Mona Lisa and the Blood Moon finds writer-director Ana Lily Amirpour spinning a stylishly lurid – if somewhat narratively undercooked – fantasy yarn." Metacritic, which uses a weighted average, assigned the film a score of 69 out of 100, based on 19 critics, indicating "generally favorable reviews".

Screen Rant has rated it 3.5 stars.

References

External links
 

2021 films
2021 fantasy films
2021 thriller films
2020s American films
2020s English-language films
2020s fantasy thriller films
2020s supernatural thriller films
American fantasy thriller films
American supernatural thriller films
Films about mind control
Films directed by Ana Lily Amirpour
Films set in New Orleans
Films shot in New Orleans